Eric Archibald (born 25 March 1965) is a retired Scottish footballer who made over 120 appearances as a central defender in the Scottish League for Cowdenbeath. He captained the club and later became a youth coach.

Personal life 
Archibald attended Beath High School.

Career statistics

Honours
Cowdenbeath

 Scottish League Second Division second-place promotion: 1991–92

Forfar Athletic

 Scottish League Third Division: 1994–95

Individual

Cowdenbeath Player of the Year: 1991–92
Cowdenbeath Hall of Fame

References

External links 

  (Cowdenbeath)
 (East Fife)

1965 births
Living people
Scottish footballers
Association football central defenders
Association football fullbacks
East Fife F.C. players
Cowdenbeath F.C. players
Forfar Athletic F.C. players
Hill of Beath Hawthorn F.C. players
Newtongrange Star F.C. players
Scottish Football League players
Raith Rovers F.C. players
People educated at Beath High School
Newburgh F.C. players
Dunfermline Athletic F.C. non-playing staff
Inverkeithing United F.C. players
Footballers from Dunfermline